This is a list of airports in Guadeloupe. Guadeloupe is an archipelago located in the eastern Caribbean. It is an overseas department of France comprising five main islands: Basse-Terre Island, Grande-Terre, La Désirade, Les Saintes and Marie-Galante. CAO location identifiers are linked to each airport's Aeronautical Information Publication (AIP), which are available online in Portable Document Format (PDF) from the French Service d'information aéronautique (SIA).



See also 

List of airports by ICAO code: T#Guadeloupe
Wikipedia: Airline destination lists: North America#Guadeloupe (France)
Transport in Guadeloupe
List of airports in France

References

External links
Aeronautical Information Service / Service d'information aéronautique (SIA), Aeronautical Information Publications (AIP)
Union des Aéroports Français 
Great Circle Mapper: Guadeloupe
World Aero Data: Guadeloupe

 
Airports
Guadeloupe
Guadeloupe